Jill Officer (born June 2, 1975) is a Canadian curler from Winnipeg, Manitoba. Officer played second for the teams skipped by Jennifer Jones from 2003 to 2018 and while they were juniors. The team won a gold medal while representing Canada at the 2014 Winter Olympics. Team Jones was the first women’s team to go through an Olympic campaign undefeated. The team has also won two World Curling Championships in 2008 and 2018, while going through the later event without a loss on their way to gold.

Officer has played on and off with Jones since she was 15. Together they won six national championships in 2005, 2008, 2009, 2010,  2015 and 2018. Officer's Scotties victories put her in an elite group of three to have won six titles. The group includes herself, Jennifer Jones, and Colleen Jones. She also won the Canadian Junior Curling Championships in 1994 together with Jones.

In 2019, Officer was named the greatest Canadian female second in history in a TSN poll of broadcasters, reporters and top curlers. She was also named the sixth greatest Canadian curler in history.

During the 2019–20 season, she coached the Tracy Fleury rink which includes her niece Kristin MacCuish.

Early life and personal
Officer was born on June 2, 1975 in Winnipeg, Manitoba. Her father, John was a former hockey player and is now a coach. Her mother Leslie, was a sports enthusiast and was trying to get Officer involved in many areas of sports. Officer took figure skating lessons, played soccer, gymnastics, and baton twirling. When she was 10, her mother Leslie signed her up for curling in the Highlander Curling Club. "I was always hanging around a curling club or a hockey rink, so I was bound to take up one of those sports," Jill said in an interview with Active Life Magazine.
Officer trekked to Mount Everest base camp in 2006.

Officer is a freelance writer and RBC Olympian, undertaking speaking engagements on behalf of Royal Bank of Canada. She also writes for The Curling News.

Officer was previously a reporter for the now defunct CKX TV station in Brandon, Manitoba. She currently resides in Winnipeg, Manitoba with her husband Devlin Hinchey, they have a daughter, Camryn. Officer studied Communications and Journalism/Broadcasting at Red River College Polytechnic. Her niece is curler Kristin MacCuish.

Career 
Officer was 15 years old when she was playing in the Highlander Curling Club in Winnipeg, Manitoba. After one game, she was pulled over by the Coke Machine by Jennifer Jones who had made it into the Canadian Finals, asking her to join the team. "I was a bit star-struck," Officer said.

Playing second for Jones, along with Trisha Baldwin at third and Dana Malanchuk at lead, the team got into the 1992 Manitoba's junior women's final before losing to Tracey Lavery. In 1993, Officer won her first title after winning the Manitoba Championships and went off to the 1993 Canadian Juniors. However, they missed the playoffs with an 8-4 record.

In 1994, they won the Manitoba Championships and went off to the Canadian Championships in Truro, Nova Scotia with Officer at second. This time, they went for a 7-4 record and defeated Sherry Linton from Saskatchewan 8-5 in the finals. Ordinarily this would mean a berth in the following year's World Junior Curling Championships, but a change in the ruling by the Canadian Curling Association (CCA) forced the team to play in a playoff the following year for the right to attend, which they lost to British Columbia. However, the CCA decided to give Jones' team another chance to qualify and put them directly at the semifinals against British Columbia in the 1995 Canadian Juniors and had lost again.

In 2008, Officer, along with Jones, Cathy Overton-Clapham and Dawn McEwen won the 2008 Scotties Tournament of Hearts and went on to win the 2008 World Women's Curling Championship.

After a disappointing run at the 2009 Canadian Olympic Curling Trials, the Jones team won the 2010 Scotties Tournament of Hearts and a bronze medal at the 2010 World Women's Curling Championship. At the end of the season, the team replaced Cathy Overton-Clapham with Kaitlyn Lawes at third.

The Jones team won the 2013 Canadian Olympic Curling Trials, representing Canada at the 2014 Winter Olympic Games in Sochi and becoming the first women's team ever to go undefeated en route to their Olympic gold medal. The following season, the team won the 2015 Scotties Tournament of Hearts and a silver medal at the 2015 World Women's Curling Championship.

Officer and the Jones team attempted but failed to repeat as the Canadian Olympic team after losing in the semifinal of the 2017 Canadian Olympic Curling Trials. Officer joined Reid Carruthers in the 2018 Canadian Mixed Doubles Curling Olympic Trials, where they advanced to the playoffs but were eliminated. The Jones team won the 2018 Scotties Tournament of Hearts, Officer's record-tying sixth title, with Shannon Birchard replacing Lawes, who, with John Morris, represented Canada at the 2018 Winter Olympic Games in mixed doubles curling. At the 2018 World Women's Curling Championship, Officer, along with Jones, Lawes, McEwen, and Birchard as their alternate, went undefeated to win the title in Officer's last world championship, as she had announced that she would be stepping away from competitive curling.

After stepping away from competitive curling, Officer remained with the Jones team, serving as their alternate, and playing lead for the team with Jones, Lawes, and Shannon Birchard at the Grand Final of the inaugural Curling World Cup, which they won. She also served as the alternate for Team Carey at the 2019 World Women's Curling Championship. The following season, she spared for Team Tracy Fleury at the 2019 AMJ Campbell Shorty Jenkins Classic and the 2019 Curlers Corner Autumn Gold Curling Classic. At the Shorty Jenkins, they made it all the way to the final before losing to ironically, Jones. At the Autumn Gold, they made it to the semifinals. Officer was officially named the team's coach before the 2020 Manitoba Scotties Tournament of Hearts.

Officer was elected to the World Curling Federation Athletes Commission in 2018 and was elected to chair the commission in 2022. As Chair of the Athletes Commission, Officer also serves as a director of the WCF Executive Board for the duration of her term.

Teams

References

External links

1975 births
Living people
Canadian women curlers
Curlers from Winnipeg
Sportspeople from Brandon, Manitoba
Writers from Winnipeg
World curling champions
Canadian women's curling champions
Canadian women sportswriters
Curlers at the 2014 Winter Olympics
Olympic curlers of Canada
Olympic gold medalists for Canada
Olympic medalists in curling
Medalists at the 2014 Winter Olympics
Continental Cup of Curling participants
Canada Cup (curling) participants
Canadian curling coaches